This is the list of cathedrals in Côte d'Ivoire.

Roman Catholic
Cathedrals of the Roman Catholic Church in Côte d'Ivoire:
 Cathedral of St. Theresa of the Child Jesus in Abengourou
 St. Paul’s Metropolitan Cathedral in Abidjan
 Cathedral of St. John Vianney in Agboville
 Cathedral of St. Odilia in Bondoukou
 Cathedral of St. Theresa of the Child Jesus in Bouaké
 Cathedral of Christ the King in Daloa
 Cathedral of St. Ann in Gagnoa
 Cathedral of the Sacred Heart in Grand-Bassam
 Cathedral of St. Joan of Arc in Katiola
 Cathedral of St. John the Baptist in Korhogo
 Cathedral of St. Michael in Man
 Cathedral of St. Augustine in Odienné
 St. Peter’s Cathedral in San Pedro
 Cathedral of St. Augustine in Yamoussoukro
 Cathedral of St. Andrew in Yopougon

See also

List of cathedrals

References

Cathedrals in Ivory Coast
Côte d'Ivoire
Cathedrals
Cathedrals